Paul Erickson is the national secretary of the federal Australian Labor Party.

Political career
Erickson worked for the Australian Council of Trade Unions  (ACTU) in research and data. In 2014, he took up the position as assistant national secretary of the Australian Labor Party. Following the resignation of Noah Carroll in 2019, Erickson was appointed acting national secretary and was appointed to the role permanently on 16 August 2019. Erickson is a member of the left faction.

Personal life
Erickson grew up in the state of Victoria. He holds a bachelor's degree in arts and economics. It was there he became involved in student politics, and was elected president of the University of Melbourne in 2003.

References

Living people
Australian trade unionists
Year of birth missing (living people)
University of Melbourne alumni
Australian Labor Party officials